The 2023 UC Irvine Anteaters men's volleyball team represents the University of California, Irvine in the 2023 NCAA Division I & II men's volleyball season. The Anteaters, led by eleventh year head coach David Kniffin, play their home games at the Bren Events Center. The Anteaters compete as members of the Big West Conference and were picked to finish third in the Big West preseason poll.

Season Highlights
Joe Karlous won the National Setter of the Week award for Week 0 games.

Preseason

Coaches poll 
The preseason poll was released on December 21, 2022. UC Irvine was picked to finish third in the Big West Conference standings.

Roster

Schedule
TV/Internet Streaming/Radio information:
ESPN+ will carry all home and conference road games. All other road broadcasts will be carried by the schools respective streaming partner. 

 *-Indicates conference match.
 Times listed are Pacific Time Zone.

Announcers for televised games
Lewis: No commentary
McKendree: No commentary
Emmanuel: Rob Espero & Charlie Brande
USC: Rob Espero & Charlie Brande
Concordia: Robbie Loya & Charlie Brande
Concordia: Jeff Runyan
BYU: Rob Espero & Charlie Brande 
BYU: 
Grand Canyon: 
Grand Canyon: 
Pepperdine: 
Pepperdine: 
UCLA: 
UCLA: 
Stanford: 
Penn State: 
UC San Diego: 
UC San Diego: 
UC Santa Barbara: 
UC Santa Barbara: 
CSUN: 
CSUN: 
Hawai'i: 
Hawai'i: 
Long Beach Sttae: 
Long Beach State:

Rankings 

^The Media did not release a Pre-season or Week 1 poll.

References

UC Irvine Anteaters men's volleyball
2023 in sports in California
2023 NCAA Division I & II men's volleyball season
UC Irvine